Elisa Alejandra Trotta Gamus is a Venezuelan lawyer, diplomat and human rights activist, named ambassador from Venezuela to Argentina by Juan Guaidó during the 2019 Venezuelan presidential crisis, and recognized immediately by Argentine president Mauricio Macri. The following administration of Alberto Fernández removed Trotta Gamus credentials.

Biography
Trotta Gamus was born in Venezuela. Her mother was communist.  Her father is Argentine lawyer Alberto Trotta, who was a political prisoner, went into exile in 1975, spent time in Venezuela, and had his family while there.  She obtained her law degree from the Central University of Venezuela, and two master's degrees from Brandeis University in Boston, where she was a Fulbright scholar. She has been living in Argentina since 2011.

Trotta Gamus specialized in human rights and international law. She was director of institutional programs for the Buenos Aires Province Chamber of Deputies, working for governor María Eugenia Vidal.  She was also president of Alianza por Venezuela, a network of exiled Venezuelans.

She is a chavismo critic, saying that Hugo Chávez and Nicolás Maduro created a "narcostate". She is Jewish, and was a diplomat to the Latin American Jewish Congress

References

External links
 

Central University of Venezuela alumni
Living people
People of the Crisis in Venezuela
Brandeis University alumni
Jewish women activists
Venezuelan Jews
Venezuelan people of Argentine descent
Venezuelan presidential crisis
Year of birth missing (living people)
Venezuelan women lawyers
Venezuelan human rights activists
Venezuelan women activists
Ambassadors of Venezuela to Argentina
Women ambassadors
Venezuelan women diplomats